Illinois's 13th Senate district is one of 59 districts of the Illinois Senate. It corresponds to the 25th and 26th districts of the Illinois House of Representatives. It spans an economically diverse area and includes the Chicago communities of East Side, Hyde Park, South Shore, and Streeterville.

Legislative district history

Prominent legislators

Senators

Representatives

List of senators

1849 – 1871

1871 – 1873

1873–present

Senator election results

2020 – 2012

2010 – 2002

2000 – 1992

1990 – 1982

1980 – 1972

1970 – 1962

1960 – 1952

1950 – 1942

1940 – 1932

1930 – 1922

1920 – 1912

1910 – 1902

1900 – 1892

1890 – 1882

1880 – 1872

Historical list of representatives

1873 – 1957

1973 – 1983

Representative election results

1980 – 1972

1954 – 1952

1950 – 1942

1940 – 1932

1930 – 1922

1920 – 1912

1910 – 1902

1900 – 1892

1890 – 1882

Notes

References 

Illinois Senate districts